Zvonko Bego (19 December 1940 – 13 August 2018) was a Yugoslav footballer. He spent most of his career with Croatian side Hajduk Split.

Club career
Bego made his debut for Hajduk in an early 1957 cup match against Lokomotiva and scored 173 goals in 375 games for the club. He moved abroad to play for Bayern Munich, FC Twente, Bayer Leverkusen and Austria Salzburg before returning to Yugoslavia in 1971 and finish his career at Junak Sinj and Uskok Klis.

International career
He made his debut for Yugoslavia in a November 1961 friendly match against Austria and earned a total of 6 caps scoring 2 goals. His final international was a December 1961 friendly against Israel. He was also part of the Yugoslavian side which won gold at the 1960 Summer Olympics, but he did not play in any matches.

References

External links
 
 Profile 

1940 births
2018 deaths
Footballers from Split, Croatia
Association football midfielders
Yugoslav footballers
Yugoslavia international footballers
Olympic medalists in football
Olympic footballers of Yugoslavia
Olympic gold medalists for Yugoslavia
Footballers at the 1960 Summer Olympics
Medalists at the 1960 Summer Olympics
HNK Hajduk Split players
FC Twente players
Bayer 04 Leverkusen players
FC Red Bull Salzburg players
NK Junak Sinj players
NK Uskok players
Yugoslav First League players
Eredivisie players
2. Bundesliga players
Yugoslav expatriate footballers
Expatriate footballers in West Germany
Yugoslav expatriate sportspeople in West Germany
Expatriate footballers in the Netherlands
Yugoslav expatriate sportspeople in the Netherlands
Expatriate footballers in Austria
Yugoslav expatriate sportspeople in Austria
Burials at Lovrinac Cemetery